John Doleva is the president and CEO of the Naismith Memorial Basketball Hall of Fame.

He became COO in 2000 and the president and CEO in 2001, and has helped the Hall prevent many financial issues and has gotten them out of crisis multiple times.

References

Year of birth missing (living people)
Living people
American chief operating officers
Naismith Memorial Basketball Hall of Fame
Place of birth missing (living people)